The World Tenpin Bowling Championships is a global event that invites all countries that are members of International Bowling Federation to participate.

Event details and history
The first World Championships was in 1954, held in Helsinki where 58 men from 7 federations took part. The next three World Championships (1955, 1958, and 1960) only had men participating. Women first participated in the 1963 World Championships in Mexico City. From 1963 to 2003, the World Championships were conducted every fourth year.

Current Championships
As a result of the expanding number of federations competing, it was agreed in 2001 to divide the two genders in World Championships beginning in 2005.  This affected the schedules for the following two 4 years cycles as follows:
 World Women Championships was conducted in 2005, 2007, 2009 and 2011.
 World Men Championships was conducted in 2006, 2008 and 2010 (2012 was moved to 2013).

World Championships for both genders were reintroduced in 2009 after a World Congress resolved to hold them every fourth year. In 2013, the inaugural edition of these so-called Combined World Championships took place. The number of teams allowed to compete in the Combined World Championships is limited to 36 teams per gender, one of which is the host federation's team, and the other 35 federations are chosen from the Zones based on the number of federations in each zone as of the qualifying date. 
The following are the most recent four-year World Championship cycles:
 2018: World Men Championships 
 2019: World Women Championships 
 2021: Combined World Championships 
The above-mentioned four-year cycles will be repeated for the 2022-2025 cycles, and so on.

Format of the games and disciplines through the years

from 1954
The format for the championships has changed many times throughout its history. In the early years of the championships, men competed in four different categories: Doubles, 4-man team, 8-man team and masters. Up until 1963 women did not participate in the event. The first year that women did take part, they competed in 4 different categories, doubles, four-person team (European Style), four-person team (American Style) and masters.  This is the only time the "European Style" has been used in the championships.  In the following championships the European style four-person team was replaced with the five-person team event (American Style) and was used until 1979.

Current format and disciplines
Singles, Doubles, Trios, Team of Five, All Events, and Masters have been the disciplines for both genders since 1979, with 6 women and 6 men on each team. The medalists for these events except the Masters from 1979 to 2007 were determined by total pinfall.

After the conclusion of singles, doubles, trios, and five-person team events, the All Events medals are presented to the top three bowlers of both genders who have accumulated the most pinfall over the 24 games.

Addition of Match-Play in the finals 
Beginning in 2008, a medal round was introduced for singles, doubles, trios, and 5 five person team event. The Medal round consisted of the top four qualifiers playing a knockout format to determine the medalists (1 vs 4 and 2 vs 3, winners of those matches face each other in the final). 

The masters event has only recently changed with the onset of the championships splitting into 2 different events.  Up until 2005 the top 16 would bowl a 16-game Round Robin with the top 3 bowlers after the 16 games advancing through to a stepladder final.  From 2005 to 2011, the masters was played using the matchplay style, best of 5 format. 

From 2013-2015, the top 24 men and women in All-Events advanced to the Masters event. All players will bowl six games with the All-Events total carried forward. The top 8 after 30 games advance to seven games of round robin match play, where 20 bonus points are awarded for a won match and 10 bonus points for a tied match. The top 4 advance to the semifinals, which is a one-game match, 1 vs 4 and 2 vs 3. The semifinal losers will earn a bronze medal. The semifinal winners advance to a one-game final match to determine gold and silver medals. In 2017, the masters format (still consisting of top 24 men and women) reverted to matchplay style, best of 3.

Modification in Team Event
Beginning in 2017, the five-person team event was modified. Qualifying was still all five players bowl ten frames each with their scores added together to determine the overall score. In the medal round, the five players bowl a best of 3 baker format, where players bowl in order one frame each (frames 1-5) and repeat the order from frames 6-10.

Dual pattern lane condition format
In 2005 the World Championships adopted the "dual pattern format" lane conditions. The two patterns are chosen from a bank of oil patterns certified by World Bowling. These oil patterns are classified as "short", "medium", and "long".  Each bowler at the championships will bowl an equal number of games on the two patterns.  In the masters, each match is played on alternating lane patterns with the highest seed having the choice of which pattern to start on.

The concept of having two different lane patterns is to force the bowlers to be more versatile in the championships. The two different lane patterns force the bowlers to attack each pattern from different angles, using different styles of play, such as ball speed, hand position and ball choice. It has been argued that in previous championships around the world, using one pattern for the whole event would suit certain bowlers over others, which was deemed as being unfair.  It was agreed that having two different lane conditions would be a fairer way of determining the best bowlers at the championships.  Many other championships around the world have also adopted this format, such as the Men's and Women's European Championships, the Asian Games, the World Ranking Masters, The Commonwealth Championships and the Asian Championships. World Bowling announced in December 2015 only one lane pattern will be used for the entirety of future World Championships, ending the dual pattern format.

Championships
World Bowling Executive Board have awarded the 2021 Combined World Championships hosting rights to Kuwait. Hong Kong will host the Men's World Championships in 2018, and Las Vegas will host the Women's World Championships in 2019.

A new event, WTBA World Singles Championships for men and women, was held for the first time in Limassol, Cyprus from September 18–26, 2012, and will be held subsequently every four years. With this new event, WTBA will stage a World Championship event every year.

Medals history
Medals:

Women's medal table
As of 2019.

Men's medal table
As of 2018.

Total medal table
As 2019

Medal winners
Please see List of WTBA World Tenpin Bowling Championships medalists.

World Championship Records

Men

Women

See also
 World Bowling Singles Championships
 World Ninepin Bowling Championships
 PBA World Championship
 QubicaAMF Bowling World Cup
 WTBA World Juniors Tenpin Bowling Championships
 Asian Tenpin Bowling Championships
 African Tenpin Bowling Championships
 Pan American Tenpin Bowling Championships
 European Tenpin Bowling Championships
 European Bowling Tour
 World Ranking Masters
 World Tenpin Masters
 Commonwealth Tenpin Bowling Championships
 Mediterranean Challenge Cup

External links
 World Bowling Website
 Official website of the Asian Bowling Federation
 Official European Tenpin Bowling Federation website
 Official website Pan American Bowling Federation
 Bowlingdigital.com, Tenpin news website
 Talktenpin.co.uk, Tenpin news website

References

 
Recurring sporting events established in 1954
Ten-pin bowling competitions
Bowling